General Porter may refer to:

Andrew Porter (Civil War general) (1820–1872), Union Army brigadier general
David Dixon Porter (Medal of Honor) (1877–1944), U.S. Marine Corps major general
Fitz John Porter (1822–1901), Union Army major general
Horace Porter (1837–1921), Union Army brevet brigadier general
Moses Porter (1756–1822), U.S. Army  brigadier general
Peter Buell Porter (1773–1844), U.S. Army brigadier general 
Ray E. Porter (1891–1963), U.S. Army major general
Robert Porter (British Army officer) (1858–1928), British Army major general
Robert W. Porter Jr. (1908–2000), U.S. Army four-star general 
Selwyn Porter (1905–1963), Australian Army major general
Whitworth Porter (1827–1892), British Army major general

See also
Attorney General Porter (disambiguation)